The Rassemblement-UMP group split from the Union for a Popular Movement group on 27 November 2012. They held 73 Members of Parliament. It dissolved in 2013.

History 
François Fillon contested the 2012 Union for a Popular Movement leadership election formed a splinter faction in the National Assembly.

Organisation 

 Chairman: François Fillon
 Secretary General: Stéphane Juvigny
 Deputy Secretary General: Agnès Evren 
 Spokesperson: Jérôme Chartier

References 

Parliamentary groups in France
National Assembly (France)
2012 establishments in France
2013 disestablishments in France